Triteleia lugens, the Coast Range triteleia or dark-mouthed triteleia, is a monocot flowering plant in the genus Triteleia. It is endemic to California, where it is known from the Coast Ranges north and south of the San Francisco Bay Area. Its habitat includes forests and chaparral.

Description
It is a perennial wildflower growing from a corm. It produces two to three basal leaves up to 40 centimeters long by one wide. The inflorescence arises on a smooth, erect stem up to 40 centimeters tall. It is an umbel-like cluster of many funnel-shaped flowers borne on short pedicels.

The flower has six yellow tepals each under a centimeter long. Northern populations have paler yellow flowers, and plants in southern areas have deeper golden yellow flowers. The tepals have dark veins. There are six stamens with yellow or blue anthers.

References

External links
Jepson Manual Treatment - Triteleia lugens
Flora of North America
Triteleia lugens - Photo gallery

lugens
Endemic flora of California
Natural history of the California chaparral and woodlands
Natural history of the California Coast Ranges
Flora without expected TNC conservation status